Ed Chalpin (January 16, 1935 in NYC – October 1, 2019 in Boca Raton, FL) was a record executive and producer. He is probably remembered for his association with Curtis Knight and the Squires which caused problems for Jimi Hendrix throughout his career. Chalpin is responsible for the recordings from that period, some of which appear on You Can't Use My Name: The RSVP/PPX Sessions.

Background
Chalpin was pusher of cover-versions, mainly covers of Top-40 hits, released under the "Twin Hits" label. Today these would be regarded as Exploito releases.
During the 1960s and leading up to 1966, a good deal of the records that his PPX Enterprises produced were cover versions. Around 25% of his cover recordings  were overseas hits. "Memphis" by Bernd Spier was released on CBS and made it to no.1 in Germany.

As of 1980, Chalpin was the owner of Dimensional Sound and Echo Studios, a 24 track facility in New York.

Career

1960s
Chalpin formed PPX Enterprises in 1961. In 1962, he had signed contracts with RCA Mexicana and Gamma Records to promote his pre-recorded tapes catalogue.

In 1964, "Summer In Sweden (Sabeline)" bw "Endless Sleep" by The Spotnicks. Chalpin was the producer for both tracks. In 1965, he was the producer on "She Can Make Me Cry" bw "I'll Be There" by Mark Richards. The PPX Studio single was released on ABC-Paramount 45-10654.

In October 1965, Jimi Hendrix was introduced to Ed Chalpin by Curtis Knight. They recorded for Chalpin and 9 days later. Despite Hendrix already signing a two-year deal with Sue Records in July 1965, Chalpin signed Hendrix to a 3-year recording contract and was given one dollar to make the contract legal. During the 1960s and leading up to 1966, a good amount of material was recorded and gave Hendrix his first credit on a recorded release. The act of signing the contract with Chalpin would be a cause of concern for Hendrix when he found fame as he was still actually contracted to Chalpin. In 1966, Billboard announced that Chalpin in partnership with Douglas "Jocko" Henderson from Philly radio station WHAT, was launching a new label called Chalco Records. The first release was to be "Suey" which featured Jayne Mansfield. The recording was made at Studio 76 aka Dimensional Sound, and it featured Jimi Hendrix on the instrumental backing.

1970s 
Chalpin produced the Curtis Knight solo album Down in the Village which was released in 1971 on Paramount Records PAS 5023. Some 47 years later Dave Segal of the Portland Mercury said that the album deserved "its own damn reissue".
In 1971, Chalpin worked with Chubby Checker who recorded a psychedelic styled album for his production company PPX. The album was released under a variety of titles including Slow Twistin' . In addition to the budget labels it was released on, the 10 track LP also was released on London Records in 1971. In 2007 a CD of the album was released on the Underground Masters label. It was given the title, Chubby Checker Goes Psychedelic!!. In addition to crediting Chalpin as the producer, it included an extra track called "The Ballad of Jimi". "The Ballad of Jimi" was also a track on an earlier Chalpin production, the Jimi Hendrix & Curtis Knight album, Get That Feeling.

It was announced in the May 12, 1973 edition of Billboard that Chalpin was now the manager of singer Jimmy Cliff and had signed deals with Warner Brothers, and EMI.
Ed Chalpin passed away in 2019.

References

American record producers
Living people
Place of birth missing (living people)
1935 births